Daniel Riley is the name of:

Daniel Aloysius Riley (1916–1984), Canadian Member of Parliament from New Brunswick
Daniel Edward Riley (1860–1948), Canadian Member of Parliament from Alberta
B. Daniel Riley (1946–2016), British-born US politician in Maryland
Daniel Riley (dancer), Indigenous Australian dancer and choreographer, artistic director of Australian Dance Theatre from the end of 2021